Svetlana Pessova (born 27 September 1981 in Ashgabat) is a retired Turkmen long jumper. Pessova qualified for the Turkmen squad in the women's long jump at the 2004 Summer Olympics in Athens by granting a tripartite invitation from the National Olympic Committee of Turkmenistan and the IAAF with her entry jump of 6.63 metres. During the prelims, Pessova fouled her first attempt, but managed to put down a tremendous effort with a 5.64-metre leap on her second attempt, missing the target by nearly a single metre from her personal best. Taking a leap by a six-centimetre deficit on her last attempt, Pessova became the last among the thirty-seven remaining long jumpers to earn a spot on the overall standings at the end of the qualifying stage.

References

External links

1981 births
Living people
Turkmenistan long jumpers
Olympic athletes of Turkmenistan
Athletes (track and field) at the 2004 Summer Olympics
Female long jumpers
Sportspeople from Ashgabat
Turkmenistan female athletes